= Tempesst =

Tempesst (Band): London-based alternative rock band

- Tempesst Performing at The Wardrobe, Leeds

Background information
- Origin: London, England
- Genres: Psychedelic pop, Psychedelic rock, Indie rock
- Years active: 2015–present
- Label: Pony Recordings
- Members: Toma Banjanin; Andy Banjanin; Blake Misipeka; Eric Weber
- Website: tempesst.net

Tempesst are a London-based alternative rock band consisting of Toma Banjanin (vocals and guitar), Andy Banjanin (drums), Blake Misipeka (bass) and Eric Weber (guitar).

The band has released three studio albums: Must Be a Dream (2020), Prisoner of Desire (2023) and Forbidden Fruit (2024).

== History ==
=== Early releases ===
Tempesst released their debut EP, Adult Wonderland, on 27 October 2017. The four-track release included "Waiheke", "Tidal Wave", "Feel Better" and "God Knows I Needed a Muse". A second EP, Doomsday, followed on 24 August 2018 through Pony Recordings. The EP contained "A Little Bit of Trouble", "Roller Coaster", "Doomsday" and "Eric's Dream".

=== Must Be a Dream ===
The band began work on their debut studio album in 2019. Must Be a Dream was released on 30 September 2020.

=== Prisoner of Desire ===
Prisoner of Desire was released on 3 March 2023. The album was preceded by singles including "Prisoner of Desire", "True Love's in Decline" and "Rags of Love". Banjanin described the later material as more personal and direct than the band's earlier work, with the group continuing to use analogue recording techniques, vintage microphones and instruments.

=== Forbidden Fruit ===
The band's third studio album, Forbidden Fruit, was released on 29 November 2024. Following the album's release Tempesst released Live from the Tobacco Warehouse, on 19 September 2025.

== Members ==
=== Current members ===
- Toma Banjanin – lead vocals, guitar
- Andy Banjanin – drums
- Blake Misipeka – bass guitar
- Eric Weber – guitar

== Discography ==
=== Studio albums ===
Title	Details
Must Be a Dream	Released: 30 September 2020; Label: Pony Recordings
Prisoner of Desire	Released: 3 March 2023; Label: Pony Recordings
Forbidden Fruit	Released: 29 November 2024; Label: Pony Recordings

=== Extended plays ===
Title	Details
Adult Wonderland	Released: 27 October 2017; 4 tracks
Doomsday	Released: 24 August 2018; Label: Pony Recordings; 4 tracks
Live from the Tobacco Warehouse	Released: 19 September 2025; 4 tracks

=== Selected singles ===
- "Tidal Wave" (2015)
- "Broke Down Blues" (2016)
- "Sunflower Lady"
- "A Little Bit of Trouble" (2018)
- "Doomsday" (2018)
- "On the Run" (2020)
- "Mushroom Cloud" (2020)
- "High on My Own" (2020)
- "Prisoner of Desire" (2022)
- "True Love's in Decline" (2022)
- "Rags of Love" (2022)
- "Sunset at Maria's (Part II)" (2023)
- "Sad Eyes" (2024)
- "Waste It With You" (2024)
